is an island located in Miyazaki, Miyazaki Prefecture, Japan. The island is part of the Aoshima Shrine. The neighbourhood Aoshima of Miyazaki consists of the island and the opposite coastal strip, where the Aoshima Subtropical Botanical Garden is located.

Access 
The nearest railway station is Aoshima Station, on the Nichinan Line operated by JR Kyushu.

The Ogre's Washboard is visible from the Nichinan Line, and the Umisachi Yamasachi will slow to allow passengers to take pictures and for an announcement on the feature to take place.

Flora
The island is covered with the world's northernmost self-reproducing population of the fan palm, Livistona chinensis 
(Arecaceae), and is one of two places in Japan with a virgin forest of this indigenous species.

Climate
Aoshima has a humid subtropical climate (Köppen climate classification Cfa) with hot summers and mild winters. Precipitation is significant throughout the year, and is heavier in summer, especially the months of June and July.

References

External links 
 

Miyazaki (city)
Islands of Miyazaki Prefecture